Rajata Rajatanavin (born 13 August 1950) is a Thai physician and professor. He was President of Mahidol University, and served as Minister of Public Health in the first cabinet of Prime Minister Prayut Chan-o-cha.

References 

Rajata Rajatanavin
Rajata Rajatanavin
Rajata Rajatanavin
Living people
1950 births
Place of birth missing (living people)
Rajata Rajatanavin
Rajata Rajatanavin